The Thomas Johnson Polygonal Barn was a historic building located near Wellman in rural Washington County, Iowa, United States. The 16-sided building measured  in diameter. The structure was covered in red vertical siding and it was topped by a sectional conical roof, with windows on the south side and an aerator. The numerous windows and the 15 hog pens that were around its perimeter suggests that this was built as a hog barn as light and ventilation in hog barns were a concern in the early 20th-century. It was listed on the National Register of Historic Places in 1986. The barn has subsequently been torn down, and it was removed from the National Register in 2014.

References

Buildings and structures in Washington County, Iowa
Barns on the National Register of Historic Places in Iowa
Polygonal barns in the United States
National Register of Historic Places in Washington County, Iowa
Former National Register of Historic Places in Iowa